Burkau (German) or Porchow (Sorbian) is a municipality in the east of Saxony, in the district of Bautzen in Germany.

Geography 

Burkau is in the northern part of the Bautzen district in a wood rich region in Upper Lusatia. It is about 6 km away - in northern direction - from the city of Bischofswerda and about 16 km - in western direction - from the main city of the district - Bautzen/Budyšin. The inner German motorway A4 between Dresden and Görlitz is near the community and has two direct connections with it. The source of the Klosterwasser/Klóšterska woda is located in the territory of Burkau/Porchow.  Nearby in the hills of the western Lusatia there is the source of the Schwarze Elster - one of the most important rivers of this region.

History 

In 1164 the village of Burkau has been mentioned for the first time in document - other sources say it happened some hundred years later in 1312 - that is why the real age of it is still not known.

The administrative community that exists today has been formed in 1994 when three formally independent communities decided to unify - those were:
 Burkau/Porchow
 Uhyst am Taucher/Horni Wujězd
 Kleinhänchen/Mały Wosyk

Together with all their smaller communities:
 Auschkowitz/Wučkecy
 Großhänchen/Wulki Wosyk
 Jiedlitz/Jědlica
 Neuhof/Nowy Dwór
 Pannewitz/Panecy
 Taschendorf/Ledźborecy

Sights 

The sights of the community are an old manor in Pannewitz, the stone-mill and the "Jiedlitzer Buchholzmühle" in Bocka and the church of Uhyst of the year 1801, now a road church in classic style.

References

External links 
Gemeinde Burkau
Autobahnkirche Uhyst a. T. (motorway-church Uhyst a. T.)

Populated places in Bautzen (district)